An Afternoon with the Vince Guaraldi Quartet is a live performance double CD by American jazz pianist Vince Guaraldi (credited to the Vince Guaraldi Quartet), released on November 24, 2011, by V.A.G. Publishing. To date, it is the last album compiled and produced by Guaraldi's son, David.

Background
Sometime after composing the soundtrack for the Peanuts television special You're in Love, Charlie Brown, Guaraldi accepted a two-week performance engagement at the Old Town Theatre in Los Gatos, California. The tracks contained on An Afternoon with the Vince Guaraldi Quartet were recorded during several of those performances, which took place on October 17–29, 1967.

It was soon after these performances that Guaraldi veered away from traditional jazz and began experimenting with electronic keyboards that Guaraldi historian Derrick Bang described as a "fusion-laced detour" resulting in albums like The Eclectic Vince Guaraldi (1969).

Track listing

Personnel 
Vince Guaraldi Quartet
 Vince Guaraldi – piano, keyboards
 Eddie Duran – guitar
 Andy Acosta – electric bass
 Al Coster – drums

References

External links 
 An Afternoon with the Vince Guaraldi Quartet at Discogs

2011 live albums
Vince Guaraldi albums
Vince Guaraldi live albums
Peanuts music